The 2018 South American Footballer of the Year award (Spanish: Rey del Fútbol de América), given to the best football player in South America by Uruguayan newspaper El País through voting by journalists across the continent, was awarded to Argentine midfielder Gonzalo "Pity" Martínez of River Plate on December 31, 2018.

The award is part of the paper's "El Mejor de América" (The Best of America) awards, which also presents the awards for South American Coach of the Year (Entrenador del año en Sudamérica) and the Best XI (Equipo Ideal), composed of the best eleven players at their positions. Marcelo Gallardo of River Plate was named Coach of the Year.

Best Player 

 Best Manager 

 Best Team 

 National awards 

 References 

 External links 

South American football trophies and awards
South American Footballer of the Year winners
South American sports trophies and awards